All Sports Band was an American pop/rock musical group who saw minor chart success in the early 1980s. The band was founded by Tracy Coats, who sought to appeal to a youthful market by dressing the band members as sports figures. Coats spent 18 months auditioning tapes before selecting the band members.    The represented sports were auto racing, baseball, boxing, football, and martial arts.  The band appeared on both Solid Gold and American Bandstand.

Personnel
Alfonso Carey (bass; dressed as a football player)
"The Boxer" (real name Jimmy Clark; drums)
Cy Sulak (guitar; baseball player)
Chuck Kentis (keyboards; race-car driver)
Michael-John Toste (vocals; martial artist)

Discography
All of the ASB's oeuvre appeared on Radio Records, a short-lived imprint of Atlantic Records.

Album

Singles

References

American pop rock music groups
1981 establishments in the United States
1982 disestablishments in the United States
Musical groups established in 1981
Musical groups disestablished in 1982